The Oriental rat flea (Xenopsylla cheopis), also known as the tropical rat flea or the rat flea, is a parasite of rodents, primarily of the genus Rattus, and is a primary vector for bubonic plague and murine typhus. This occurs when a flea that has fed on an infected rodent bites a human, although this flea can live on any warm blooded mammal.

Body structure 
The Oriental rat flea has no genal or pronotal combs. This characteristic can be used to differentiate the Oriental rat flea from the cat flea, dog flea, and other fleas.The flea's body is about one tenth of an inch long (about ). Its body is constructed to make it easier to jump long distances. The flea's body consists of three regions: head, thorax, and abdomen. The head and the thorax have rows of bristles (called combs), and the abdomen consists of eight visible segments.A flea's mouth has two functions: one for squirting saliva or partly digested blood into the bite, and one for sucking up blood from the host. This process mechanically transmits pathogens that may cause diseases it might carry. Fleas smell exhaled carbon dioxide from humans and animals and jump rapidly to the source to feed on the newly found host. The flea is wingless so it can not fly, but it can jump long distances with the help of small, powerful legs. A flea's leg consists of four parts: the part that is closest to the body is the coxa; next are the femur, tibia, and tarsus. A flea can use its legs to jump up to 200 times its own body length (about ).

Life cycle

There are four stages in a flea's life. The first stage is the egg stage. Microscopic white eggs fall easily from the female to the ground or from the animal she lays on. If they are laid on an animal, they soon fall off in the dust or in the animal's bedding. If the eggs do fall immediately on the ground, then they fall into crevices on the floor where they will be safe until they hatch one to ten days later (depending on the environment that they live in, it may take longer to hatch). They hatch into a larva that looks very similar to a worm and is about two millimeters long. It only has a small body and a mouth part. At this stage, the flea does not drink blood; instead it eats dead skin cells, flea droppings, and other smaller parasites lying around them in the dust. When the larva is mature it makes a silken cocoon around itself and pupates. The flea remains a pupa from one week to six months changing in a process called metamorphosis. When the flea emerges, it begins the final cycle, called the adult stage. A flea can now suck blood from hosts and mate with other fleas. A single female flea can mate once and lay eggs every day with up to 50 eggs per day.

History
The Oriental rat flea was collected in Shendi, Sudan by Charles Rothschild along with Karl Jordan and described in 1903. He named it cheopis after the Cheops pyramids.

Disease transmission 
This species can act as a vector for plague, Yersinia pestis, Rickettsia typhi and also act as a host for the tapeworms Hymenolepis diminuta and Hymenolepis nana. Diseases can be transmitted from one generation of fleas to the next through the eggs.

Gallery

References

External links 
 
 

Pulicidae
Rodent-carried diseases
Insect vectors of animal pathogens
Insect vectors of human pathogens
Parasites of rodents
Insects described in 1903